Union Station describes two distinct, defunct train stations in Providence, Rhode Island. Parts of the latter one were renovated and the building contains offices and restaurants.

Union Station (1847–1887) 
The original Union Station was Providence's first, opening in 1848 to accommodate the needs of the newly thriving city. This building was designed by 21 year old Rhode Island architect, Thomas Alexander Tefft in the Lombard Romanesque style. Construction of the station was supervised by Tallman & Bucklin.  Extending 720 feet along the edge of Exchange Place, the structure was the largest railroad station in the United States the time of its construction. The building has also been dubbed longest building in the country at the time, though this assertion is disputed. 

In 1885, American Architect and Building News voted the building one of the 20 best buildings in the country. 20th century architectural historian Henry-Russell Hitchcock wrote of the station, "without much question it was the finest early station in the New World."

As the city continued to grow, so too did the need for terminal space, ultimately resulting in the paving over of the remnants of the city's inland bay in 1890. The question of what to do with the now undersized station was spontaneously answered on February 21, 1896 when the building suffered a catastrophic fire that effectively gutted the structure.

Union Station (1898–1986) 
A much larger Union Station was opened in 1898, clad in distinctive yellow brick, which the Providence Journal heralded as "a new era of history of this city". The station was designed by the firm of Stone, Carpenter & Willson, which had also designed other Providence buildings. Though rail use was expected to grow, by the 1980s rail traffic had dropped 75 percent. City planners saw the opportunity to dismantle the "Chinese Wall" of train tracks that hemmed in Providence's central business district and moved MBTA and Amtrak service to a new, smaller Providence station about a half mile north in 1986.

Redevelopment (1987–Present) 
Union Station caught fire in April 1987 amidst $11 million in renovations, forcing a change of plans. Parts of the original station have now been renovated and the building contains offices and restaurants, including the Union Station Brewery.

The center-most building of Union Station now houses the Rhode Island Foundation, which leases space to The Public's Radio, RI Kids Count, and Women's Fund RI.

In April 2022, the development of a food hall in the lower level of Union Station was announced. The food hall is expected to open in May 2023, with space for 13 restaurants and bars.

References

External links

Railway stations in the United States opened in 1898
Railway stations on the National Register of Historic Places in Rhode Island
Former Amtrak stations in Rhode Island
Providence
Former railway stations in Rhode Island
Transportation in Providence, Rhode Island
Buildings and structures in Providence, Rhode Island
Historic American Buildings Survey in Rhode Island
National Register of Historic Places in Providence, Rhode Island
Historic district contributing properties in Rhode Island
Transportation buildings and structures in Providence County, Rhode Island